The 2000 Pennzoil 400 was a NASCAR Winston Cup event that occurred on November 12, 2000. The race is known for Bobby Labonte clinching his first Winston Cup title by finishing 4th. Tony Stewart won the race, leading 166 of the 267 laps run. Steve Park was on the Pole. This event was the 2nd Winston Cup event that was covered on NBC.

Lasting for three hours and eight minutes, the race would be slowed down four times for a duration of 25 laps; or 9% of the total race. The average green flag duration was slightly more than 48 laps. Six drivers were involved in terminal crashes; including last-place finisher Scott Pruett. Eight drivers failed to qualify for this race; including Kyle Petty. Morgan Shepherd withdrew from the race even though he had a good chance of qualifying.

Entry list

Qualifying results

Race results

Timeline
Section reference: 
 Start of race: Steve Park started the race as the pole position driver.
 Lap 10: Jimmy Spencer took over the lead from Steve Park; ultimately losing it to Ricky Rudd on lap 25.
 Lap 23: Andy Houston and Scott Pruett were jointly involved in a terminal crash; forcing them out of the race.
 Lap 26: Caution flag due to Scott Pruett and Andy Houston's accident; green flag racing resumed on lap 31.
 Lap 28: Jeremy Mayfield took over the lead from Elliott Sadler before losing it to Tony Stewart on lap 53.
 Lap 31: Ward Burton, Mike Bliss, and Geoffrey Bodine were jointly involved in a terminal crash; knocking them out the event prematurely.
 Lap 33: Caution flag due to a four-car accident; green flag racing resumed on lap 39.
 Lap 53: Tony Stewart took over the lead from Jeremy Mayfield before losing it to Ricky Rudd on lap 91.
 Lap 58: Stacy Compton's vehicle suffered from a terminal crash; ending his weekend on the track.
 Lap 78: John Andretti's vehicle developed major engine issues.
 Lap 94: The handling on Darrell Waltrip's vehicle became problematic; ending his day on the track.
 Lap 97: Tony Stewart took over the lead from Ricky Rudd before losing it back to Ricky Rudd on lap 149.
 Lap 153: Ricky Rudd took over the lead from Bobby Labonte before losing it to Tony Stewart on lap 184.
 Lap 184: Tony Stewart took over the lead from Ricky Rudd before losing it back to Ricky Rudd on lap 211.
 Lap 210: Caution due to debris; green flag racing resumed on lap 218.
 Lap 219: Tony Stewart took over the lead from Ricky Rudd; dominating the remainder of the race.
 Lap 224: Caution due to debris; green flag racing resumed on lap 226.
 Finish: Tony Stewart won the race after two accidents and two cautions for debris, Bobby Labonte officially clinches the championship with one race remaining.

Standings after the race

References

Pennzoil 400
Pennzoil 400
NASCAR races at Homestead-Miami Speedway